Pascale Dorcelus (born 27 December 1979) is a Canadian weightlifter.

Dorcelus competed at the 2002 Commonwealth Games where she won a gold medal in the 63 kg snatch event and a bronze medal in the 63 kg total event.

References

External links
 

1979 births
Living people
Canadian female weightlifters
Weightlifters at the 2002 Commonwealth Games
Commonwealth Games gold medallists for Canada
Commonwealth Games bronze medallists for Canada
Commonwealth Games medallists in weightlifting
20th-century Canadian women
21st-century Canadian women
Medallists at the 2002 Commonwealth Games